Jushqan (also Romanized as Jūshqān and Jowsheqān; also known as Jowsheghan) is a village in Kuhpayeh Rural District, Nowbaran District, Saveh County, Markazi Province, Iran. At the 2006 census, its population was 366, in 142 families.  The correct spelling is Jowshaqan.

References 

Populated places in Saveh County